Île-Garth Ecological Reserve is an ecological reserve of Quebec, Canada. It was established on April 30, 2003.

References

External links
 Official website from Government of Québec

Protected areas of Laurentides
Nature reserves in Quebec
Protected areas established in 2003
2003 establishments in Quebec